Zivka Park (born 21 January 1985) is a French politician who served as the member of the National Assembly for the 9th constituency of the Val-d'Oise department from 2017 to 2022. She is a member of La République En Marche! (LREM).

Political career
In parliament, Park served as member of the Committee on Sustainable Development and Regional Planning. In addition to her committee assignments, she was part of the French-Serbian Parliamentary Friendship Group. In 2020, Park joined En commun (EC), a group within LREM led by Barbara Pompili.

Park lost her seat in the first round of the 2022 French legislative election.

Other activities
 SNCF, Member of the Supervisory Board

See also
 2017 French legislative election

References

1985 births
Living people
Deputies of the 15th National Assembly of the French Fifth Republic
La République En Marche! politicians
21st-century French women politicians
People from Aubervilliers
Politicians from Île-de-France
Women members of the National Assembly (France)
Members of Parliament for Val-d'Oise